Richard Astley may refer to:

Rick Astley (born as Richard Paul Astley in 1966), British singer
Richard Astley (Warden of All Souls) (c. 1625–1688), of the Astley baronets